Slaughter Creek is a  saltwater creek that drains into the Little Choptank River. It separates Taylors Island, Maryland from the mainland.

References

Rivers of Maryland
Rivers of Dorchester County, Maryland
Tributaries of the Chesapeake Bay